Union Mill or Union Mills may refer to:

British Isles

Communities
Union Mills, a village on the Isle of Man

Windmills
Union Mill, Appledore, a windmill in Kent
Union Mills, Burnham Overy, a combined wind and watermill in Norfolk
Union Mill, Beverley,  a windmill in the East Riding of Yorkshire
Union Mill, Cranbrook, a windmill in Kent
Union Mill, Gainsborough, a windmill in Lincolnshire
Union Mill, Gilberdyke,  a windmill in the East Riding of Yorkshire
Union Mill, Hackney, a windmill in Middlesex
Union Mill, Lynstead, a windmill in Kent
Union Mill, Onehouse, a windmill in Suffolk
Union Mill, Whitby,  a windmill in the North Riding of Yorkshire
Union Mills, Thurning a windmill in Norfolk
Boreas Union Mill, Pontefract,  a windmill in the West Riding of Yorkshire

Watermills
Union Mills, Burnham Overy, a combined wind and watermill in Norfolk

Textile mills
Union Mills, Milnsbridge, Yorkshire

United States
(by state)
Communities
Union Mills, Indiana, an unincorporated community
Union Mills, Iowa, an unincorporated community
Union Mills, Maryland, an unincorporated community
Union Mills, Virginia, an unincorporated community
Union Mill, Washington, an unincorporated community
Union Mills, Pleasants County, West Virginia, an unincorporated community

Watermills
Union Mills (Fall River, Massachusetts), listed on the National Register of Historic Places (NRHP)
Union Mill Complex, Ballston Spa, NRHP-listed

Other
Union Mills Homestead Historic District, Westminster, Maryland, NRHP-listed
Union Mills Superintendent's House, Olympia, NRHP-listed in Thurston County